Goneplax is a genus of crabs, in the family, Goneplacedae, containing the following extant species:
Psopheticus crosnieri 
Psopheticus musicus 
Psopheticus stridulans 
Psopheticus vocans 
A further species (Psopheticus shujenae) is known from the fossil record (as is also Psopheticus stridulans), dating from 0.012 Ma onwards.

It was first described in 1892 by James Wood-Mason.

References

Goneplacoidea